Gibeon ( giḇʻôn, giv'ôn) may refer to:

 Gibeon (ancient city), a Canaanite city north of Jerusalem that was conquered by Joshua
 Gibeon Constituency, the constituency whose administrative centre is the Namibian village of Gibeon
 Gibeon (meteorite), an iron meteorite found in Namibia near Gibeon
 Gibeon, Namibia, a village in the Hardap region of Namibia
 Gibeon Railway Station, a railway station serving the town of Gibeon in Namibia
 Gibeon Bradbury (1833–1904), painter from Buxton, Maine, United States
 Giv'on HaHadashah, an Israeli communal settlement northwest of Jerusalem
 Thomas Givon (born 1936), linguist, rancher, musician and writer
 Pool of Gibeon, a site in Gibeon mentioned a number of times in the Hebrew Bible